Louis-Do de Lencquesaing (born 25 December 1963) is a French actor and film director. His daughter, Alice de Lencquesaing, is also an actress.

Filmography

As an actor

Les dernières heures du millénaire (1990, Short)
Madame Bovary (1991)
La vie des morts (1991) as Nicolas
Le sommeil d'Adrien (1991, Short) as Adrien
De l'histoire ancienne (1991, Short)
The Sentinel (1992)
Mensonge (1993) as Rémi
Hélas pour moi (1993) as Ludovic, un élève
Ainsi Soient-Elles (1995) as Laurent
Encore (1996) as Bruno
For Sale (1998)
Alissa (1998) as Bukovski
Mécréant (1998, Short) as Vincent
Les infortunes de la beauté (1999) as François
Marée haute (1999, Short)
Sentimental Destinies (2000) as Arthur Pommerel
Anywhere Out of the World (2000, Short) as Antoine
A Private Affair (2002) as Philippe
Le loup de la côte Ouest (2002) as Le commissaire Vianet
La vie promise (2002) as Maquereau 1
La bête du Gévaudan (2003, TV Movie) as Beauterne
Petites coupures (2003) as André
Les corps impatients (2003) as L'interne Hopital
Louis la brocante (2003, TV Series) as Joseph Letano
L'empreinte (2004) as Armand, l'éditeur
Avocats & associés (2004, TV Series) as Steven Berger
Face à l'amour (2005, Short) as Vincent
Les invisibles (2005) as Le physionomiste club échangiste
Caché (2005) as Bookstore Owner
Au suivant! (2005) as Le réalisateur
Un couple parfait (2005) as Vincent
Vénus & Apollon (2005, TV Series) as Édouard Pages
Gaspard le bandit (2006, TV Movie) as Le banquier
La jungle (2006) as L'examinateur
L'intouchable (2006) as L'amant de Jeanne
La loi de la forêt (2006)
Le créneau (2007, Short) as Mathias
Le sang noir (2007, TV Movie) as Capitaine Plaire
Dans l'ombre du maître (2007, TV Movie) as Marchelier
Opération Turquoise (2007, TV Movie)
Animal singulier (2008, Short) as Simon
A Day at the Museum (2008) as Jocelyn Paulin
À l'est de moi (2008) as Le client
L'école du pouvoir (2009, TV Movie) as Marceau
Clara, une passion française (2009, TV Movie) as Duvauchelle
Father of My Children (2009) as Grégoire Canvel
La femme invisible (d'après une histoire vraie) (2009) as François
How to Seduce Difficult Women (2009) as Philippe
Services sacrés (2009, TV Series) as Palmidas
Le mariage à trois (2010) as Stéphane
La peau de chagrin (2010, TV Movie) as Taillefer
Un soupçon d'innocence (2010, TV Movie) as Dominique Roussel
Même pas en rêve (2010, Short) as Le père de la jeune fille
Empreintes criminelles (2011, TV Series) as Victor Francis
Polisse (2011) as M. de la Faublaise
The Silence of Joan (2011) as Jean de Luxembourg
House of Tolerance (2011) as Michaux
My Little Princess (2011) as Antoine Dupuis, l'éditeur
The Art of Love (2011) as Ludovic
A Happy Event (2011) as Jean-François Truffard – le prof de philo
Elles (2011) as Patrick
Paris Manhattan (2012) as Pierre
In a Rush (2012) as Paul Bastherlain
Les coquillettes (2012) as P.-A.
Superstar (2012) as Jean-Baptiste
It Boy (2013) as Julien
Alias Caracalla, au coeur de la Résistance (2013, TV Mini-Series) as Bernard (Emmanuel d'Astier de La Vigerie)
Kaboul Kitchen (2014, TV Series) as Paul Braque
Des lendemains qui chantent (2014) as Jacques Sadoun
Get Well Soon (2014) as Le chirurgien
The Price of Fame (2014) as L'avocat
Valentin Valentin (2014) as Freddy Livorno
Spiral (2014-2020, TV Series)
The Art Dealer (2015) as Melchior
Taj Mahal  (2015) as Père de Louise
Francofonia (2015) as Jacques Jaujard
Looking for Her (2015) as Alex
Orage (2015) as Pierre
Blind Sun (2015) as Gilles
Marseille (2016) as Stéphane
The Dancer (2016) as Armand Duponchel – le directeur de l'Opéra
Brice 3 (2016) as Docteur Louis-Do de Bordeaux
Ares (2016) as PDG Donevia
Money (2017) as Mercier
 (2017, TV Series) as Charles Varane
Le lion est mort ce soir (2017) as Le réalisateur
One Nation, One King (2018) as Louis XIV
L'amour est une fête (2018) as Le propriétaire du manoir
À cause des filles..? (2019) as Bernard
Convoi exceptionnel (2019) as Arthur Combasse
Ibiza (2019) as Michel
La sainte famille (2019) as Jean
The Things We Say, the Things We Do (2020) as Le réalisateur
Lost Illusions (2021)
Return to Seoul (2022)
Kompromat as L'ambassadeur de France
Bardot (2023) as Henri-Georges Clouzot

As a director
Mécréant (short film, 1998)
Première séance (short film, 2006)
Même pas en rêve (short film, 2010)
In a Rush (2012)
Les 18 du 57, Boulevard de Strasbourg (short film, 2014)
La sainte famille (2019)

References

External links

 

Living people
1963 births
Film directors from Paris
French male film actors
French male television actors
20th-century French male actors
21st-century French male actors